Tony Bleasdale is an Australian politician currently serving as the Mayor of the Blacktown City Council, the second-largest local government area in New South Wales by population, and fifth most-populous local government in Australia. He previously served as deputy mayor from 2016 to 2019, and has been a Blacktown City Councillor since his election in 1996.

Bleasdale succeeded Stephen Bali as mayor in an extraordinary meeting of council in October 2019 and was re-elected unopposed by council on 9 September 2020.

He was awarded an Order of Australia Medal in 2010 for his service to the community.

References 

Living people
Mayors of places in New South Wales
Year of birth missing (living people)